This is the discography of British rockabilly band Matchbox.

Albums

Studio albums

Live albums

Compilation albums

Singles

References

Discographies of British artists
Rock music group discographies